Papilio sjoestedti, the Kilimanjaro swallowtail, is a species of butterfly in the family Papilionidae. It is endemic to Kilimanjaro Region of Tanzania.

Description
In 1960, Robert Herbert Carcasson wrote: "Male very similar to above (fulleborni), but white band very narrow in both wings. Female similar to above (fulleborni), but ochreous discal area of hindwing much smaller. Both sexes may be distinguished from all other species of the group by the very much darker underside."

Taxonomy
Papilio sjoestedti is a member of the echerioides species-group. This clade includes:
Papilio echerioides Trimen, 1868
Papilio fuelleborni Karsch, 1900
Papilio jacksoni Sharpe, 1891 
Papilio sjoestedti Aurivillius, 1908

It is mostly treated as a subspecies of Papilio fuelleborni.

Etymology
It was named for Swedish naturalist Bror Yngve Sjöstedt.

References

Carcasson, R.H. 1960 "The Swallowtail Butterflies of East Africa (Lepidoptera, Papilionidae)". Journal of the East Africa Natural History Society pdf Key to East Africa members of the species group, diagnostic and other notes and figures. (Permission to host granted by The East Africa Natural History Society

sjoestedti
Butterflies of Africa
Butterflies described in 1908
Insects of Tanzania
Endemic fauna of Tanzania
Taxa named by Per Olof Christopher Aurivillius
Taxonomy articles created by Polbot